Chatswood Public School is a primary and public school that was founded in 1883, located in the suburb of Chatswood in Sydney, New South Wales, Australia. This school provides a playground which has been changed throughout the years and four buildings.

Sport
Chatswood Public School is involved in many Sporting Activities, and is involved it is involved in one PSSA competition,  Ku-Ring-Gai district competition. In 2007, the Chatswood Public School Senior A's Cricket and Soccer Team came first in the Ku-Ring-Gai cricket and soccer competitions. The Summer sports consists of Modball (Tee-ball), Cricket and Oztag and the Winter sports consist of Netball, Australian rules football and Soccer. The School has annual Athletics, Swimming and Cross Country Carnivals, in which students are chosen to represent the school in higher grades.

The four sporting houses, all named after early governors of Australia, are:

 Phillip (Blue) Named after Arthur Phillip
 Hunter  (Yellow) Named after John Hunter
 King    (Red) Named after Phillip Gidley King
 Bligh   (Green) Named after William Bligh

Chatswood Education Precinct 
Planning is currently underway for a major redevelopment of the school, along with the nearby Chatswood High School. Under the current proposal, all buildings on the current site will be substantially refurbished for use by years 10-12 from the high school. The primary school will move into new four-storey buildings on the high school site.

Notable alumni
 Brett Whiteley - Australian artist
 Roger Woodward - Australian concert pianist and Australian Living Treasure
 Charlie Macartney - Former Australian cricket player and inductee to the Australian Cricket Hall of Fame
 Danielle Spencer - Australian actress and singer/songwriter
 Adam Spencer - Australian radio presenter, comedian and media personality
 Victor Smith - First Australian Naval Officer to reach four star rank

Notes and references

External links 
 Official website of the School

Public primary schools in Sydney
Educational institutions established in 1883
Chatswood, New South Wales
1883 establishments in Australia